Roberto Ierusalimschy (born May 21, 1960) is a Brazilian computer scientist, known for creating the Lua programming language. He holds a PhD in Computer Science from the Pontifical Catholic University of Rio de Janeiro where he has an appointment as a full professor of informatics. He did a post-doc at University of Waterloo in 1992 and was visiting professor at Stanford University in 2012. He is the leading architect  and the author of Programming in Lua.  He also created LPeg, a Lua library for implementing parsing expression grammars. 

In 2021, Roberto created Building a Programming Language, a project-based learning program where students learn how to build a programming language from scratch.

References

External links

 
 
 
 
 
 

1960 births
Brazilian computer scientists
Brazilian Jews
Living people
People from Rio de Janeiro (city)
Pontifical Catholic University of Rio de Janeiro alumni
Academic staff of the Pontifical Catholic University of Rio de Janeiro
Programming language designers